Fenella Ng Gar-loc (born 25 July 1968) is a Hong Kong swimmer and rower. She competed as a swimmer at the 1984 Summer Olympics and the 1988 Summer Olympics and as a rower at the 2000 Summer Olympics.

Ng is of Chinese and British descent. She took up swimming at an early age. She trained at the Mantas Swimming Club along with Hung Cee Kay. In swimming at the 1986 Asian Games, she won bronze in the women's 4 × 100 m freestyle relay with Hung, Fu Mui, and Lee Sau-mei. She studied chemical engineering at the University of Leeds. Following her return to Hong Kong in 1993, for her final appearance as a swimmer at the Asian Games in 1994, she won silver in the women's 4 × 100 m freestyle relay. After a break from sport, in 1995 she took up rowing. She represented Hong Kong in that sport at the 1998 Asian Games, and in 2000 became the first Hong Kong athlete to compete in two different sports at the Olympics. The following year, she retired from competition. She co-founded the Tritons Triathlon Club in 2008 with fellow Olympians Annemarie Munk and Michael Tse. Fenella also served as President of the Hong Kong Triathlon Association which grew to 2,500 members.

References

External links
 

1968 births
Living people
Alumni of the University of Leeds
Hong Kong female freestyle swimmers
Hong Kong female rowers
Olympic swimmers of Hong Kong
Olympic rowers of Hong Kong
Swimmers at the 1984 Summer Olympics
Swimmers at the 1988 Summer Olympics
Rowers at the 2000 Summer Olympics
Place of birth missing (living people)
Commonwealth Games competitors for Hong Kong
Swimmers at the 1982 Commonwealth Games
Swimmers at the 1986 Commonwealth Games
Asian Games medalists in swimming
Asian Games medalists in rowing
Swimmers at the 1982 Asian Games
Swimmers at the 1986 Asian Games
Swimmers at the 1990 Asian Games
Swimmers at the 1994 Asian Games
Rowers at the 1998 Asian Games
Asian Games silver medalists for Hong Kong
Asian Games bronze medalists for Hong Kong
Medalists at the 1986 Asian Games
Medalists at the 1994 Asian Games
Medalists at the 1998 Asian Games